"What's So Different?" is a song by American R&B singer Ginuwine. It was co-written and produced by Timbaland for his second album 100% Ginuwine (1999). The song is built around a sample of "Valleri" (1968) by American band The Monkees. Due to the inclusion of the sample, Thomas Boyce and Bobby Hart are also credited as songwriters. Released as the album's second single, "What's So Different?" reached the top ten of the UK Singles Chart and entered the top twenty in New Zealand. It the United States, the song peaked at number three on the Rhythmic chart, also reaching number 21 on the US Hot R&B/Hip-Hop Songs.

Lyrical content and music video
"What's So Different" lyrically describes the narrator questioning his lover who is cheating on her boyfriend to be with him. He claims that if she is cheating on another man to be with him, she may also cheat on him to be with someone else. The music video was directed by Francis Lawrence. "What's So Different" samples the Monkees' 1968 hit "Valleri".

Track listing

Notes
 denotes additional producer
Sample credits
"What's So Different?" contains an interpolation of "Valleri" (1968) as performed by The Monkees.

Credits and personnel
Credits lifted from the liner notes of 100% Ginuwine.

Thomas Boyce – writer (sample)
Bobby Hart – writer (sample)
Ginuwine – vocals, writer
Timbaland – producer, writer

Charts

Weekly charts

Year-end charts

References

1999 singles
Ginuwine songs
Music videos directed by Francis Lawrence
Song recordings produced by Timbaland
Songs written by Bobby Hart
Songs written by Tommy Boyce
Songs written by Ginuwine
Songs written by Timbaland
550 Music singles
Epic Records singles
1999 songs